Yersiniops newboldii is a species of praying mantis found in Baja California, Mexico.  The original scientific description for this species was published in Transactions of the American Entomological Society  in 1931.

See also
List of mantis genera and species

References

Mantidae
Insects of Mexico
Fauna of the Baja California Peninsula
Natural history of Baja California
Mantodea of North America
Insects described in 1931